Qiz Qapan (also Romanized as Qīz Qāpān; also known as Kizganāb, Kyzgalar, Qezqāpān, and Qez Qāpān) is a village in Bedevostan-e Gharbi Rural District, Khvajeh District, Heris County, East Azerbaijan Province, Iran. At the 2006 census, its population was 92, in 25 families.

References 

Populated places in Heris County